Princess Thyra Island is an uninhabited island of the Wandel Sea, Greenland. The island is within King Frederick VIII Land in the Northeast Greenland National Park. The island was named after Princess Thyra of Denmark.

Geography
This island is located east of Princess Margaret Island, to the northwest of Princess Dagmar Island close to the coast of far northeastern Greenland, in a bay of the Wandel Sea at the confluence of Denmark Sound and Independence Sound.  

The island has an area of 313 km ² and a shoreline of 85.7 kilometres. It was formerly part of Avannaa, originally Nordgrønland ("North Greenland"), one of the counties of Greenland until 31 December 2008.

See also
List of islands of Greenland

References

Uninhabited islands of Greenland